Berlinia orientalis is a species of plant in the family Fabaceae. It is found in Mozambique and Tanzania.

References

Detarioideae
Flora of Mozambique
Flora of Tanzania
Vulnerable plants
Taxonomy articles created by Polbot